This article gives an overview of liberalism and radicalism in Bulgaria. It is limited to liberal and radical parties with substantial support, mainly proved by having had a representation in parliament. The sign ⇒ denotes another party in that scheme. For inclusion in this scheme it is not necessary that parties label themselves as a liberal party.

Background

Liberalism was a dominant political force at the end of the nineteenth century. The current got strongly divided.

History
After the restoration of democracy in 1990, some parties got a liberal character.
Liberalism is now represented by the mainly Turkish minority party Movement for Rights and Freedoms (Dviženie za prava i svobodi, observer LI, member ELDR), the National Movement for Simeon II (Nacionalno Dviženie Simeon Vtori, member LI, ELDR) and Democratic Bulgaria (Demokratichna Balgariya), both taking a more or less liberal position.

From Liberal Party to Democratic Party
1879: Liberal forces united in the Liberal Party (Liberalna Partija)
1884: A right-wing faction formed the ⇒ Progressive Liberal Party
1886: Another right-wing faction formed the ⇒ People's Liberal Party
1887: A third faction formed the ⇒ Radoslav Liberal Party
1896: The party is renamed into Democratic Party (Demokratičeska Partija)
1905: A radical faction seceded as the ⇒ Radical Democratic Party
1923: A faction joined the Democratic Alliance (Demokratičeski Sgovor)
1934: The party is banned by the dictatorship
1945: The party is revived
1947: The party is banned by the communist dictatorship
1989: The party is revived as a Christian conservative party

Progressive Liberal Party
1884: A right-wing faction of the ⇒ Liberal Party formed the Progressive Liberal Party (Progresivnoliberalna Partija)
1920: The party merged into the United People's Progressive Party  (Obedinena Narodnoprogresivna Partija)

People's Liberal Party
1886: A right-wing faction of the ⇒ Liberal Party formed the People's Liberal Party (Narodnoliberalna Partija)
1920: The party merged into the ⇒ National Liberal Party

Radoslavist Liberal Party / National Liberal Party
1887: A right-wing faction of the ⇒ Liberal Party formed the Radoslav Liberal Party (Liberalna-Radoslavistka Partija)
1904: A right-wing faction seceded as the ⇒ Tonchevist Young Liberal Party
1920: The party merged with the ⇒ Tonchevist Young Liberal Party and the ⇒ People's Liberal Party into the National Liberal Party (Nacionalliberalna Partija)
1934: The party is banned by the dictatorship

Tonchevist Young Liberal Party
1904: A right-wing faction of the ⇒ Radoslav Liberal Party seceded as the Tonchevist Young Liberal Party (Mladoliberalna Partija-Tončevisti)
1920: The party merged into the ⇒ National Liberal Party

Radical (Democratic) Party
1905: A radical faction of the ⇒ Democratic Party seceded as the Radical Democratic Party (Radikaldemokratičeska Partija)
1922: The party is renamed Radical Party (Radikalna Partija)
1923: A faction joined the Democratic Alliance (Demokratičeski Sgovor)
1934: The party is banned by the dictatorship
1945: The party is revived
1949: The party is banned by the communist dictatorship
1989: The party is refounded as the Radical Democratic Party (Radikaldemokratičeska Partija)
1990s: The party took part in various electoral alliances with decreasing success

Movement for Rights and Freedoms
1990: Representatives of the Turkish minority formed the Movement for Rights and Freedoms (Dviženie za Prava i Svobodi), that develops in a more or less liberal direction

National Movement for Simeon II
2001: Followers of the ex-king formed the personalist National Movement for Simeon II (Nacionalno Dviženie Simeon Vtori), that takes a more or less liberal position in the spectrum
2006: GERB split from NDSV, which adopted more conservative position than NDSV.

"Blue" Parties/Urban Right
1989: Centre-right and conservative forces form the Union of Democratic Forces (SDS).
1997: SDS forms with minor parties such as ⇒ Democratic Party, National DPS (split from ⇒ DPS), Union of Free Democrats (split from SDS) and ⇒ RDP the United Democratic Forces.
2005: The conservative-liberal Democrats for a Strong Bulgaria (Демократи за силна България) split from the conservative SDS.
2007: Mariya Kapon leaves ⇒ Democratic Party and forms the United People's Party (Единна народна партия).
2008: Gospodin Tonev leaves SDS and forms the Bulgarian Democratic Community (Българска демократична общност).
2009: The conservative SDS, DSB, the social democratic Bulgarian Social Democratic Party, the agrarian United Agrarians and ⇒ Radical Democratic Party formed the centre-right Blue Coalition, leading to a series of centre-right coalitions which take a more or less liberal position in the spectrum.
2012: Meglena Kuneva leaves ⇒ NDSV and formed Bulgaria for Citizens Movement (Движение „България на гражданите“).
2012: Nadezhda Neynsky leaves SDS and formed Blue Unity (Синьо единство).
2014: BNG, DSB and SDS formed the Reformist Bloc. SE and ENP formed The Rights.
2014: Movement for European Unification and Solidarity  (Движение за европейско обединение и солидарност) was formed and the Democratic Action Movement (Движение „Демократично действие“) split from SDS.
2015: DSB leaves the Reformist Bloc.
2017: Former Minister of Justice Hristo Ivanov formed Yes, Bulgaria! (Да, България!) and joins forces with DEOS. DSB and BDO form the "New Republic".
2018: Blue Unity and DEOS dissolve. Coalition for you Bulgaria (Коалиция за теб България) was formed.
2018: DSB, the green-liberal Green Movement and Yes, Bulgaria! form Democratic Bulgaria.
2019: ENP and DS form "Rise".
2021: ENP and DBG join Stand Up! Mafia, Get Out!. KztB and BDO form "We, the Citizens". DS dissolves. Dignity of United People (Достойнството на един народ) split from DBG to join Democratic Bulgaria.

We Continue the Change
2021: Kiril Petkov and Asen Vasilev and formed We Continue the Change, that takes a more or less liberal position in the spectrum.
2022: We Continue the Change (Продължаваме промяната) became a party.

Liberal leaders
 Pre-communist period
 Democratic Party: Petko Karavelov - Aleksandar Malinov - Nikola Mushanov
 Progressive Liberal Party: Dragan Tsankov - Stoyan Danev
 People's Liberal Party: Stefan Stambolov - Dimitar Petkov
 Radoslavist Liberal Party: Vasil Radoslavov
 Post-communist period
 Zhelyu Zhelev - Ahmed Dogan - Simeon Sakskoburggotski - Ognyan Gerdzhikov

See also
 History of Bulgaria
 Politics of Bulgaria
 List of political parties in Bulgaria

Politics of Bulgaria
Bulgaria